Lou Drofenik (born Lou Zammit, 1941) is a Maltese-Australian novelist and academic. She lives in Victoria, Australia.

Life 
Drofenik was born in Birkirkara, Malta. Her father was a stonemason. She completed her primary and secondary education in Malta, and taught at the Siġġiewi primary school before migrating to Australia in 1962 under the Single Women's Migrant Scheme. She followed undergraduate and graduate degrees in education at La Trobe University, and pursued her doctoral studies at the same university, focusing on the effects of migration on the moral identity of Maltese migrant women in Australia. Since then, she has worked as an educator in the Australian Catholic primary school system.

She is married, and has four children and eight grandchildren.

Awards and honours 
She is the recipient of three Malta National Book Council Awards - in 2008 for In Search of Carmen Caruana in the category of Novel or Short Story in English, in 2010 for Cast the Long Shadow in the category of Novel in Another Language, and in 2017 for The Confectioner's Daughter in the category of Novel in Maltese or English. Two of her novels - Of Cloves and Bitter Almonds and Beloved Convict - were also awarded the Australian North Central Literary Award.

Work 
Drofenik has published eight novels. Her fiction is founded on extensive historical research, and focuses on the migrant experience, specifically in a Maltese-Australian context. Her work is notable for its engagement with questions of Maltese and migrant identity, and has been praised for its engagement with female perspectives and experiences in distinction to the "predominantly patriarchal outlook" of much of the Maltese literary tradition.

List of publications 
 Birds of Passage (self-published,)
 In Search of Carmen Caruana (self-published,)
 Of Cloves and Bitter Almonds (National Biographic,)
 Cast the Long Shadow (National Biographic,)
 Beloved Convict (Maltese Historical Society,)
 Bushfire Summer (self-published,)
 The Confectioner's Daughter (Horizons,)
 Love in the Time of the Inquisition (Horizons, 2017)

References 

1941 births
Living people
Maltese women novelists
21st-century Maltese novelists
21st-century Maltese women writers
21st-century Australian novelists
21st-century Australian women writers
English-language writers from Malta